Sujata Keshavan (born 1961) is an Indian graphic designer. She is a co-founder of Ray and Keshavan, a brand design firm based in India.

Early life 
Keshavan's father was an engineer, and her mother was a painter. After considering studying medicine, taking a BSc in Mathematics or joining a fine arts college, she ended up joining the National Institute of Design, Ahmedabad.

Education
Keshavan graduated from the National Institute of Design, Ahmedabad in 1984. She then pursued her Masters degree at Yale, graduating in 1987 with a Master of Fine Arts in graphic design from the School of Art, Yale University. At Yale, she studied under designers Paul Rand, Bradbury Thompson, Matthew Carter and Armin Hofmann.

Career

Ray + Keshavan 
After completing her studies at Ahmedabad, Keshavan worked with Ram Ray at his advertising agency, Response, for six months starting in January 1985. After graduating with a Master of Fine Arts from Yale, Keshavan moved back to India. In 1989, she co-founded Ray + Keshavan, in India, with her former boss Ray. The portfolio of clients include Infosys, Kotak Mahindra Bank, the Himalaya Drug Co., Bharti Airtel, Hindustan Lever, Reliance, ITC, Wipro, McKinsey, Dr Reddy’s, Dabur, Max Group, TVS, MindTree, as well as several airports across the country. In 2000, Keshavan was instrumental in giving the 130-year-old Himalaya Drug Company a complete image makeover, reworking on the brand architecture and reinventing the look and feel of the company, into the brand 'Himalaya', whose DNA was "researching nature, enriching life". She is also the one who has given the indigenous MTR a modern, international look. She was also involved in designing the logo of Infosys and Ashoka University. Ray + Keshavan was acquired by WPP Group Plc in 2006.

Varana Design Ltd. 
In 2016, Keshavan co-founded Varana Design Ltd., an “artisanal luxury fashion brand", with entrepreneurs Ravi Prasad and Meeta Malhotra. It is located on Dover Street, in London’s Mayfair area. Varana is positioned as an Indian luxury brand  Woven fabrics are embellished using traditional Indian techniques or with modern cuts. The store has been designed by one of the partners at Pentagram, London-based architect, William Russell, as well as by Keshavan herself. It is spread across 4,359 square feet, an interesting feature of which, are window displays consisting  bamboo sculptures of dresses created by Sandeep Sangaru, a furniture designer in Bengaluru.

Awards and Achievements 

 Keshavan is the only Indian graphic designer to be honoured twice as the Graphic Designer of the Year at the annual Advertising and Marketing (A & M) awards.
She won the Eastern Press Award and the Schickle–Collingwood Prize for outstanding work.
She received the Outstanding Woman Professional of the Year, 2007, awarded by the Federation of Indian Chambers of Commerce and Industry (FICCI).
In 2006, she was named among India's 30 most powerful women by India Today.
In 2011, she was placed 18th on Fortune India's list of most powerful women in business.
She is a member of the World Economic Forum Global Agenda Council on Design & Innovation.
From 2016, she is a Member of the Governing Council at the National Institute of Design, Ahmedabad.
In 2019, she was presented the Design Icons 2019 Awards in The Graphic and communication design, by India Design Forum.

Keshavan has been an invited speaker at many international conferences including Design Indaba in South Africa and the International Design Center at Nagoya, Japan. She was a jury member at ReBrand 100 at the Rhode Island School of Design and a member of the Design Jury at the Cannes Lions International Advertising Festival. She served as the Chairperson of the jury at the Business World Awards for Design Excellence, and Chairperson of The Design Yatra awards for Excellence in South Asian Design.

Personal life
Keshavan lives in Bangalore and is married to the historian Ramachandra Guha. They have two children.

References

External links
 Ray and Keshavan Design

Indian graphic designers
1961 births
Living people
National Institute of Design alumni